Viktor Piisang (10 July 1918 – 24 September 1944) was an Estonian footballer.

He was born in Rapla. He studied for three years at Tallinn Technical School.

He played for the club Estonia, which in 1938 and 1939 won Estonian championships.

1938–1940 he was a member of Estonia men's national football team.

In 1941, he was mobilized into the Red Army. He was injured at Battle of Velikiye Luki and was killed in Kohila, while being transported to Saaremaa.

References

1918 births
1944 deaths
Estonian footballers
Soviet military personnel killed in World War II
People from Rapla